John Killigrew may refer to:

 Sir John Killigrew (died 1584), Governor of Pendennis Castle
 Sir John Killigrew (died 1605), MP for Penryn